Napoletani a Milano (internationally released as Neapolitans in Milan) is a 1953 Italian comedy film directed by Eduardo De Filippo. It entered the competition at the 14th Venice International Film Festival. In 2008 the film was selected to enter the list of the 100 Italian films to be saved.

Cast 
Eduardo De Filippo: Salvatore Aianello
Anna Maria Ferrero: Nannina
Tina Castigliano: Irene
Frank Latimore: Enrico
Baldassarre Caruso: Antonio Capasso
Thea Prandi: narrator
Laura Gore: Rosetta
Vittorio Sanipoli: Giovanni
Luigi Russo: Vincenzino
Renata Corridi: Secretary
Sonia Holm: Mrs. Vittorini

References

External links

1954 films
1954 comedy films
Italian comedy films
Films set in Milan
Films with screenplays by Age & Scarpelli
Films scored by Renzo Rossellini
Italian black-and-white films
1950s Italian films